"Then Who Am I" is a song written by Dallas Frazier and A.L. "Doodle" Owens, and recorded by American country music artist Charley Pride.  It was released in November 1974 as the second single from the album Pride of America.  The song was Pride's fourteenth number one song on the country chart.  The single stayed at number one for one week and spent a total of nine weeks on the country chart.

Chart performance

References
 

1974 songs
Charley Pride songs
1975 singles
Songs written by Dallas Frazier
Songs written by A.L. "Doodle" Owens
Song recordings produced by Jack Clement
RCA Records singles